A flak jacket or flak vest is a form of body armor. It is not designed to protect against bullets fired from most small arms such as rifles or handguns. However, certain flak jackets are able to sustain certain gunshots, depending on the armor, the projectile, the angle at which the shot was fired (an oblique angle for example), and the range from which the shot was fired.

The term "flak jacket" is often colloquially applied to newer body armor featuring protection against small arms projectiles, but the original usage predated the existence of modern and more resistant bulletproof vests and the two are not interchangeable in performance.

History 
Anecdotes describing garments designed to protect the wearer from penetrating weapons can be found far back into recorded history. Two types of protective garment from the American Civil War in the 1860s had a basic design similar to the flak jacket or ballistic armor of modern times in that solid plates were used as the main ballistic protection. The "Soldiers' Bullet Proof Vest" was manufactured by the G. & D. Cook & Company of New Haven, Connecticut.  It consisted of two pieces of steel inserted into the pockets of a regular black military vest.  Versions for infantry weighed 3 ½ pounds while a version for cavalry and artillery weighed 7 pounds. They sold for $5–7. A more medieval-looking type of armor was made by the Atwater Armor Company, also of New Haven. It consisted of four large plates of steel held on the body by broad metal hooks over the shoulders and a belt around the waist. The Atwater vest was heavier than the Cook models and cost about twice as much.

During World War I, a number of British and American officers recognized that many casualties could be avoided if effective armor were available. Isolated efforts at developing armor were made, and soldiers could make individual purchases or efforts, but there was no armor issued to the troops. As it is today, issues of weight, cost, availability of materials and/or environmental stability complicated the issue of developing armor that would also be effective. For example, soft armor made of silk was tried on a small scale based on Japanese designs, but this material did not last well under harsh environmental conditions.

The first usage of the term "flak jacket" refers to the armor originally developed by the Wilkinson Sword company during World War II to help protect Royal Air Force (RAF) aircrew  from the flying debris and shell fragments thrown by German anti-aircraft guns' high-explosive shells (flak itself is an abbreviation for the German word "Fliegerabwehrkanone" (aircraft-defense gun)). The idea for the flak jacket came from Col. Malcolm C. Grow, Surgeon of the US Eighth Air Force in Britain. He thought that many wounds he was treating could have been prevented by some kind of light armor. In 1943 he was awarded the Legion of Merit
 
The Royal Air Force subsequently offered the jackets to the United States Army Air Forces, which adopted them as a Defense Standard. The UK subsequently supplied the USAAF with 9,600 flak jackets under lend-lease.

During World War II, flak jackets and steel helmets were worn by US Navy personnel on aircraft carriers during battle, since the ships and especially their flight decks offered little protection for their crew. The jackets were supposed to protect against shell fragments and heat.

Ballistic protection  
Col. Grow’s request to the Wilkinson Sword company was to develop a vest that could stop a .45 caliber round fired at close range. Although flak jackets offered some protection against small caliber bullets and shell fragments, ultimately they proved to be less effective than hoped. Flak jackets are now generally considered to be inferior to modern ballistic vests.

It was claimed that the M-1951 flak jacket could stop a 90 grain 7.62×25mm Tokarev pistol round at the muzzle of the gun. However, even the Vietnam era revised flak jacket was not capable to stop high power pistol rounds, even less an AK-47 rifle bullet (7.62×39mm). Nevertheless, it did a good job of stopping shell blasts, flying debris, grenade fragments, ricochets and direct hits from mild power pistol rounds.

Although they were not tested to be compliant with the NIJ standards, the Army's M1952a & M69 ballistic nylon Flak Jackets performed slightly better than NIJ level 1 body armor.

It was not until 1970 that the U.S. National Institute of Justice, which now publishes test and performance standards for body armor, began a deliberate program to develop body armor for law enforcement personnel that would be effective against specific threats that were common causes of officer injury and death. At the time that included .38 Special and .22 Long Rifle bullets, in particular, and also bullets from 9mm, .45, and .32 caliber firearms.

Materials 
The first flak jackets consisted of manganese steel plates sewn into a waistcoat made of ballistic nylon (a material engineered by the DuPont company); therefore, flak jackets functioned as an evolved form of plate armor or brigandine. The first flak jacket weighed 22 pounds.

During the Korean and Vietnam wars, the flak jacket was changed and the manganese steel plates were replaced by other materials. The U.S. Army's vests (Body Armor, Fragmentation Protective, Vest M69) weighed under eight pounds and were made of 12 layers of ballistic nylon. The vests used by the U.S. Marines (Vest, Armored M-1955) weighed more than ten pounds and were a combination of ballistic nylon layers and fiberglass plates known as Doron. Doron was made of fiberglass fibers placed in an ethyl cellulose resin under high pressure. It was named after then-Colonel Georges F. Doriot, then director of the Military Planning Division, Office of the Quartermaster General.

The generation of armor developed in the 1970s through the National Institute of Justice incorporated layers of soft armor in the form of DuPont’s Kevlar fabric, which has since become synonymous with ballistic protection and a general term used for several similar (aramid-based) materials.

See also

Buff coat, an Early Modern protective shirt
Hauberk, an earlier form of body armor, used to defend against swords, knives, etc.
Mail (armour), an ancient form of personal armour consisting of linked metal rings which has also been used to provide protection against blast and shrapnel injury

References

Jackets
Body armor